Jose E. Martinez (born July 28, 1941) is an American lawyer and a United States district judge of the United States District Court for the Southern District of Florida.

Early life and education
Martinez was born in 1941 in Santo Domingo, Dominican Republic. He received his Bachelor of Business Administration degree from the University of Miami in 1962 and his Juris Doctor from the University of Miami School of Law in 1965.

Career
Martinez served in the United States Naval Reserve from 1964 to 1993, and was a Navy legal officer from 1965 to 1968.

Martinez served as a law clerk in private practice in 1965. He was an Assistant United States Attorney for the Southern District of Florida from 1968 to 1970. Martinez was in private practice in Florida from 1970 to 2002. From 1972 to 1974, he was regional director of the Office for Drug Abuse Law Enforcement of the Department of Justice.

President George W. Bush nominated Martinez to the United States District Court for the Southern District of Florida on January 23, 2002, to the seat vacated by Edward B. Davis. Confirmed by the Senate on September 13, 2002, he received commission on September 17, 2002.

Martinez was the judge in Sinaltrainal v. Coca-Cola.

See also
List of Hispanic/Latino American jurists

References

External links

1941 births
Living people
Assistant United States Attorneys
Hispanic and Latino American judges
Judges of the United States District Court for the Southern District of Florida
United States district court judges appointed by George W. Bush
21st-century American judges
University of Miami School of Law alumni
United States Navy officers
People from Santo Domingo
University of Miami Business School alumni